Teichelberg is a mountain of Bavaria, Germany.

Mining of a 45-meter thick basalt layer started in 1888

References

Mountains of Bavaria
Mountains under 1000 metres